Oeneis melissa, the Melissa Arctic, is a species of butterfly in the family Nymphalidae.

The wingspan is 42–51 mm.

The larvae feed on various sedges, including Carex bigelowii and Carex rupestris.

Subspecies
Oeneis melissa melissa (Newfoundland, Labrador)
Oeneis melissa also (Boisduval, [1833]) (Polar Urals, Arctic Asia, Taymur, Chukot Peninsula, Kamchatka, Wrangel Island)
Oeneis melissa orientalis Kurentzov, 1970 (eastern Yakutia, Magadan)
Oeneis melissa daizetsuzana Matsumura, 1926 (Japan)
Oeneis melissa semidea (Say, 1828) (New Hampshire)
Oeneis melissa semplei Holland, 1931 (Quebec, inner Labrador, Hudson Bay)
Oeneis melissa assimilis Butler, 1868 (Northwest Territories)
Oeneis melissa gibsoni Holland, 1931 (Alaska, Yukon, northern British Columbia)
Oeneis melissa beanii Elwes, 1893 (Alberta, British Columbia, Washington, Montana, Wyoming)
Oeneis melissa lucilla Barnes & McDunnough, 1918
Oeneis melissa karae Kusnezov, 1925 (polar tundra of northern Siberia)

References

Butterflies described in 1775
Oeneis
Insects of the Arctic
Taxa named by Johan Christian Fabricius